Bradinopyga geminata is a species of dragonfly in the family Libellulidae known commonly as the granite ghost. It is native to India, Sri Lanka and Thailand, where it is a common and widespread species.

Description and habitat
It is a medium sized dragonfly with brown-capped grey eyes. Its thorax is cinereous, marbled and peppered with black in a very irregular manner. Wings are transparent with dual color pterostigma, black at centre and pure white at distal and proximal ends. Abdomen is coloured very similarly to thorax; black marbled with yellow, but with a more definite plan. Segments 3 to 8 have pale basal annules interrupted on dorsum, and formed by two elongate parallel spots. There is a triangular apical sub-dorsal spot and a pale mid-dorsal spot. Anal appendages are creamy-white. Female is similar to the male.
 
Taking advantage of its cryptic coloration, it always rests flat on slab rock or cement-plastered  walls, where it almost invisible. Adults occupy habitat near water bodies, such as pools, irrigation channels, wells, and containers with standing water. It breeds in rainy hollows in the rocks or in wells and small cemented tanks.

The species has been studied as a predator of the disease-carrying yellow fever mosquito (Aedes aegypti). The larvae of the dragonfly consume the larvae of the mosquito in the standing-water habitat types that both occupy.

See also 
 List of odonates of Sri Lanka
 List of odonates of India
 List of odonata of Kerala

References

 A. Venkatesh and B.K. Tyagi. 2013. Predatory potential of Bradinopyga geminata and Ceriagrion coromandelianum larvae on dengue vector Aedes aegypti under controlled conditions (Anisoptera: Libellulidae; Zygoptera: Coenagrionidae; Diptera: Culicidae). Odonatologica 42(2): 139-149.
 A. Venkatesh and B.K. Tyagi. 2013. Capture efficiency of Bradinopyga geminata (Odonata: Libellulidae) against larvae of Aedes aegypti, Culex tritaeniorhynchus and Anopheles stephensi in laboratory condition.  Journal of Basic and Applied Biology. 7:21-26.

External links

Libellulidae
Insects described in 1842